Hesus Rebolusyonaryo is a 2002 Philippine science fiction drama film written and directed by Lav Diaz. The film stars Mark Anthony Fernandez as the title role.

The film is streaming online on YouTube.

Plot
Set in 2011 when the Philippines is taken over by a military junta, Hesus Mariano (Mark Anthony) is ordered by Rebel Leader Miguel Reynante (Ronnie) to assassinate his cellmates. After a series of battles, Hesus finds himself in a coma, only to wake up in the hands of Col. Arnold Simon (Joel). Drawing inspiration from his childhood sweetheart Hilda (Donita), Hesus decides to take control of the game.

Cast
 Mark Anthony Fernandez as Hesus
 Donita Rose as Hilda
 Joel Lamangan as Col. Arnold Simon
 Ronnie Lazaro as Miguel Reynante
 Pinky Amador as Lucia Sarmiento
 Ricardo Cepeda as Lt. Delfin Cordero
 Bart Guingona as Eddie Teves
 Richard Joson as Carlo Montes
 Orestes Ojeda as Col. Castor
 Marianne de la Riva as Aling Sima
 Lawrence Espinosa as Gen. Cyrus Racellos
 Tado Jimenez as Tasyo
 Dido dela Paz as Checkpoint Officer
 Diding Andres as Woman at Checkpoint
 Forsythe Cordero as Rebel Contact
 Jojo Vinzon as Mamasan
 Bernabe Cordova as Military Doctor
 Cris de Gracia as Nurse

Production
Principal photography of the film lasted for 20 days. The titular character is inspired by José Rizal's characters Crisostomo and Simoun. This marks Donita Rose's comeback film after four years, her last being the 1998 film Legacy.

A symposium for the film was held at the University of the Philippines Film Center on January 24, 2001.

Reception
The film performed poorly in the box office and was pulled out from theaters two days after its release. Nonetheless, it received dominantly positive reviews. Andrew Paredes of the Manila Standard praised the film for retaining the iconoclasm throughout the film. However, he criticized Diaz's constant allegiance to his own ethic for Donita's brief presence in the film. Noel Vera describes the film as dystopian type of science fiction. He praised Diaz for combining the influences of José Rizal, George Orwell and video games in the film with ideas fit for at most six films. He also cited mixed reaction regarding the story's uneven flow; gunfire scenes patterned after Counterstrike inserted between extended meditative stillness.

References

External links

Full Movie on Regal Entertainment

2002 films
2002 drama films
2002 science fiction films
Filipino-language films
Philippine drama films
Philippine science fiction films
Regal Entertainment films
Films directed by Lav Diaz